Pseudo-Probus was a 4th century grammarian, whose writings are sometimes referenced today in regards to Latin.

He wrote a number of books on the subject, including Catholica, Condiscipulus, and Institutio. He also wrote at least one text on the author Vergil.

References

4th-century people
Linguists